This is a list of films which have placed number one at the weekend box office in Romania during 2008.

Highest-grossing films

See also
 List of Romanian films
 List of highest-grossing films in Romania

References

Romania
2008
2008 in Romanian cinema